The 2022 AFC U-23 Asian Cup qualification was an international men's under-23 football competition which decided the participating teams of the 2022 AFC U-23 Asian Cup.

A total of 16 teams qualified to play in the final tournament, including Uzbekistan who qualified automatically as hosts country.

Due to non-compliance to doping regulations, the World Anti-Doping Agency (WADA) banned Indonesia and Thailand from using their national flags in competitions, except during the Olympics. It was reported that Indonesia prepared the flag of its federation, in the event its team was barred from using the national flag.

Draw
Out of the 47 AFC member associations, a total of 42 teams entered the competition. The final tournament hosts Uzbekistan decided to participate in qualification. Their matches were not taken into account when calculating the group ranking and best second-placed teams among the groups.

The draw was held on 9 July 2021, 12:00 (UTC+5), in Tashkent, Uzbekistan. The 42 teams were drawn into nine groups of four teams and two groups of three teams. For the draw, teams were divided into two zones:
West Zone: 23 teams from West Asia, Central Asia and South Asia, to be drawn into five groups of four teams and one group of three teams (Groups A–F).
East Zone: 19 teams from ASEAN and East Asia, to be drawn into four groups of four teams and one group of three teams (Groups G–K).

The teams were seeded according to their performance in the 2020 AFC U-23 Championship final tournament and qualification (overall ranking shown in parentheses). The eleven teams which indicated their intention to serve as qualification group hosts prior to the draw were drawn into separate groups.

On 29 July, North Korea withdrew from the competition due to safety concerns related to the COVID-19 pandemic. As a result, to better balance of the number of teams across all groups, the AFC conducted a draw on 11 August to move one team from Groups G to J, which was Hong Kong, who were placed in Group K. On 11 October, China also withdrew from the competition for the same reason, leaving Group G with only two teams.

Notes
Teams in bold qualified for the final tournament.
(H): Qualification group hosts determined before the draw
(H)*: Qualification group hosts determined after the draw
(Q): Final tournament hosts, automatically qualified regardless of qualification results
(W): Withdrew after draw

Notes
(X): Suspended

Draw result
The draw resulted in following groups.

Bold indicates that the team has qualified for the final tournament.

Player eligibility
Players born on or after 1 January 1999 were eligible to compete in the tournament.

Format
In each group, teams played each other once at a centralized venue. The eleven group winners and the four best runners-up qualified for the final tournament.

In group G, after the withdrawal of Brunei and China PR, the two teams left (Australia and Indonesia) played each other twice. The winner qualified for the final tournament, with the loser eliminated.

Tiebreakers
Teams were ranked according to points (3 points for a win, 1 point for a draw, 0 points for a loss), and if tied on points, the following tiebreaking criteria were applied, in the order given, to determine the rankings.

Points in head-to-head matches among tied teams;
Goal difference in head-to-head matches among tied teams;
Goals scored in head-to-head matches among tied teams;
If more than two teams are tied, and after applying all head-to-head criteria above, a subset of teams are still tied, all head-to-head criteria above were reapplied exclusively to this subset of teams;
Goal difference in all group matches;
Goals scored in all group matches;
Penalty shoot-out if only two teams are tied and they met in the last round of the group;
Disciplinary points (yellow card = 1 point, red card as a result of two yellow cards = 3 points, direct red card = 3 points, yellow card followed by direct red card = 4 points);
Drawing of lots.

Groups
All matches were played between 23 October and 2 November 2021.

Group A
All matches were held in Qatar.
Times listed are UTC+3.

Group B
All matches were held in Tajikistan.
Times listed are UTC+5.

Group C
All matches were held in Bahrain.
Times listed are UTC+3.

Group D
All matches were held in Uzbekistan.
Times listed are UTC+5.
Uzbekistan already qualified to the final tournament as host country, so their matches were not taken into account when calculating the group ranking.
Originally Kuwait was supposed to host group D; however, the AFC changed host country due to the COVID-19 pandemic in the country. On 19 October 2021, Uzbekistan was named replacement host.

Group E
All matches were held in the United Arab Emirates
Times listed are UTC+4.

Group F
All matches were held in Jordan.
Times listed are UTC+2.

Group G
Both matches were held in Tajikistan.
Times listed are UTC+5.
After the withdrawal of Brunei and China PR, the remaining teams left played each other twice. The winner qualified for the final tournament, with the loser eliminated.

Group H
All matches were held in Singapore.
Times listed are UTC+8.

Group I
All matches were to be held in Taiwan (Chinese Taipei), but AFC determined that the host would be changed, with Kyrgyzstan as the new host.
Times listed are UTC+6.

Group J
All matches were held in Mongolia.
Time listed are UTC+8.

Group K
All matches were held in Japan.
Times listed are UTC+9.
DPR Korea withdrew from the competition on 29 July. They were replaced by a team initially drawn in Group G–J (excluding host countries and teams from Pot 1), which was determined by a draw on 11 August to be Hong Kong.

Ranking of second-placed teams
Due to groups having different numbers of teams, the results against the fourth-placed teams in four-team groups were not considered for this ranking.

Exceptions:
 In Group D, the results against the host country Uzbekistan were not considered.
 In Group G, the runners-up results were not considered for this ranking, as the group contained only two teams.

Goalscorers
There were 114 individuals who scored at least 1 goal.

Qualified teams
The following teams qualified for the 2022 AFC U-23 Asian Cup.

1 Bold indicates champions for that year. Italic indicates hosts for that year.

See also
2022 AFC Women's Asian Cup qualification

References

Qualification
AFC U-23 Championship qualification
U-23 Asian Cup qualification
2021 in youth association football
March 2021 sports events in Asia